An Oxbridge reject is someone who has been rejected from either the University of Oxford or the University of Cambridge. The term Oxbridge is a portmanteau of Oxford and Cambridge.

The term has received some criticism for its derogatory and elitist nature. Eric Thomas, vice-chancellor of Bristol University, has criticised it because of the way in which it makes people view British higher education through an Oxbridge prism.

In 2000, Gordon Brown, then Chancellor of the Exchequer and subsequently Prime Minister of the United Kingdom, started a major political row about higher education when he accused Oxford University of elitism in its admissions procedures. The Laura Spence Affair, as it became known, is one of the most publicised cases of an Oxbridge reject. Rejected from Magdalen College, Oxford, to read medicine, Laura Spence went on to study with a scholarship at Harvard in the United States. The rejection was seen as discrimination because of her state-school background.
She subsequently went on to study graduate-entry medicine (a 4-year course) at Wolfson College, Cambridge.

In literature
The Oxbridge Reject Society Prospectus is a satirical book by Daniel Goodhart and Murray Buesst purporting to represent a society for people who have been rejected by the two elite universities.

References

Reject
English culture
Academic culture
Academic terminology